Marguerite B. Lehner (born August 5, 1950) is the current Mayor of Kettering, Ohio. Formerly, she also served in the Ohio Senate, Ohio House of Representatives, and on the Kettering City Council. Her Senate district was located entirely in Montgomery County, and included Vandalia, Riverside, Kettering, Centerville, Miamisburg and Germantown. Lehner is a Republican.

Career
Having attended American University of Paris and graduating from Saint Mary-of-the-Woods College, Lehner was a three-term city councilwoman in Kettering, sat on the Ohio Ethics Commission from 1991 to 1997, served as a board member for the Greater Dayton Regional Transit Authority and has been active in efforts to address issues facing Dayton-area suburbs for decades.

While Lehner was originally elected to the Ohio House of Representatives in 2008, she came first to the Statehouse as a member of the Ohio Senate. When Senator Jeff Jacobson resigned his seat early, he left a vacancy in an important lame duck session. Since Jacobson's elected successor Jon Husted was at that time serving as Speaker of the Ohio House, he was unable to resign and take his new seat in the Senate. Therefore, Senate leadership appointed Lehner to temporarily take a seat in the Senate to fill out the remainder of Jacobson's term. Following a month-long tenure in the Senate, Lehner then began her term as in the House.

With incumbent and Speaker of the House Husted unable to run due to term limits, Lehner opted to succeed him. She faced Democrat Andi Eveslage in the general election, and won with 64% of the vote. She easily won reelection in 2010 with 70% of the vote, but only would serve about a week of that term.

Return to the Ohio Senate
After Senator Husted was elected as Ohio Secretary of State on November 2, 2010, he was required to resign his seat in the Ohio Senate. Lehner, who preceded Husted (albeit for only a month-long tenure), was named as a potential successor once the seat had been vacated. Lehner was up against five other potential appointees, including former state Representative Seth Morgan.

On December 13, 2010, it was announced that the Senate Republicans had decided to appoint Lehner to fill the remaining two years of Husted's term. In a homecoming of sorts, Lehner was sworn into the seat she previously held on January 11, 2011, resigning from the House to do so.

Lehner won a full term in the Ohio Senate in 2012, defeating Democrat Rick McKiddy with 63% of the vote. In 2013, she began serving as Chairwoman of the Senate Education Committee. Lehner, as Chairwoman, was influential in education policy, including charter school reform. Although she is pro-charter, she has advocated for stronger charter school oversight and reform.

Electoral history

References

External links
The Ohio Senate: Senator Peggy Lehner (R) - District 6
Peggy Lehner for Ohio, official campaign website
The Ohio Ladies' Gallery: Peggy Lehner

Living people
Republican Party members of the Ohio House of Representatives
Women state legislators in Ohio
1950 births
Republican Party Ohio state senators
Politicians from Cleveland
People from Kettering, Ohio
Ohio city council members
Women city councillors in Ohio
21st-century American politicians
21st-century American women politicians